Le Pradet is a commune in the Var department in the Provence-Alpes-Côte d'Azur region in southeastern France.

Olive oil, vegetables and wine grape (including rare Tibouren variety used for rose wine) are produced in the local farms.

Population

International relations

Le Pradet, is twinned with Gelnica, Slovakia.

See also
Communes of the Var department

References

External links

 http://www.le-pradet.fr/ Official home page of the commune
 https://www.besport.com/l/GjGR0kNj The commune’s basketball team’s website 
 http://volleypradetlagarde.fr/ The commune’s volleyball team’s website
 https://www.allocine.fr/seance/salle_gen_csalle=P1062.html The commune’s mobile theatre website

Communes of Var (department)
Geological type localities
Populated coastal places in France